Madhurasmitham is a 2021 children's film. It is a social film that tells the story of the excellence of government schools and the students who study there. It was the first film directed by Sureshgayathri. Madhurasmitham is the first Sanskrit-language children's film made in the world. The film stars Sanskrit teachers and students.

Production
Madhurasmitham was produced by NK Ramachandran, KE Manoharan, KG Ramabai and BR Lali under the banner of Sanskrit Productions.

Release
Madhurasmitham was screened at the first National Sanskrit Film Festival in Rajasthan.

References

2021 films
Sanskrit-language films
Indian children's films